Christian M. Lopes (born October 1, 1992) is an American professional baseball infielder who is currently a free agent. He made his MLB debut in 2022.

Amateur career
In 2006, Lopes was named the Under-13 National Baseball Player of the Year by Baseball America. He played for the United States national baseball team in the 2010 World Junior Baseball Championship. Lopes attended Valencia High School in Santa Clarita, California, for two years. As a sophomore, Lopes batted .453 with 15 home runs and 33 runs batted in (RBIs). He was named the Santa Clarita Valley Player of the Year and the Foothill League's most valuable player. His family moved and he transferred to Edison High School in Huntington Beach, California. He committed to attend the University of Southern California.

Career

Toronto Blue Jays
The Toronto Blue Jays selected Lopes in the seventh round of the 2011 MLB draft. He split the 2012 season between the Bluefield Blue Jays and the Vancouver Canadians, hitting a combined .278/.339/.462/.801 with four home runs and 33 RBIs. He played for the Lansing Lugnuts in 2013, hitting .245/.308/.336/.644 with five home runs and 66 RBIs. He spent the 2014 season with the Dunedin Blue Jays, hitting .243/.329/.350/.679 with 3 home runs and 33 RBI. He split the 2015 season between Dunedin and the New Hampshire Fisher Cats, hitting a combined .260/.339/.325/.664 with two home runs and 38 RBIs. In 2016, he again split the season between Dunedin and New Hampshire, hitting .283/.353/.402/.755 with six home runs and 56 RBIs. In 2017, he split the season between the GCL Blue Jays, Dunedin, and the Buffalo Bisons of the Class AAA International League, hitting a combined .269/.357/.421/.778 with seven home runs and 46 RBIs.

Texas Rangers
After the 2017 season, Lopes signed a minor league contract with the Rangers. He played for the Round Rock Express of the Class AAA Pacific Coast League in 2018, hitting .261/.365/.408/.773 with 12 home runs and 52 RBIs. He split the 2019 season between the Frisco RoughRiders and the Nashville Sounds, hitting a combined .265/.356/.422/.778 with 13 home runs and 65 RBIs. He became a free agent following the 2019 season.

Miami Marlins
On December 18, 2019, Lopes signed a minor league contract with the Miami Marlins. Lopes did not play in a game in 2020 due to the cancellation of the minor league season because of the COVID-19 pandemic. He was released by the team on September 1, 2020.

Arizona Diamondbacks
On October 14, 2020, Lopes signed a minor league deal with the Arizona Diamondbacks. Lopes spent the 2021 season with the Triple-A Reno Aces. Lopes played in 66 games, hitting .271 with nine home runs and 34 RBIs. He became a free agent following the 2021 season.

Oakland Athletics
On March 11, 2022, Lopes signed a minor league contract with the Oakland Athletics. He began the season with the Las Vegas Aviators. On April 18, Lopes was added to the Athletics roster as a COVID-related substitute. He made his MLB debut on April 20. Lopes went hitless in nine at-bats with a walk for Oakland before he was removed from the 40-man roster and returned to Triple-A on April 27.

He was released by the Athletics organization on August 2, 2022.

Personal life
His brother, Tim, is also a professional baseball player. Married and expecting first child with his wife, Ashley.

References

External links

1992 births
Living people
American expatriate baseball players in Canada
American sportspeople of Brazilian descent
Baseball players from California
Bluefield Blue Jays players
Buffalo Bisons (minor league) players
Canberra Cavalry players
Dunedin Blue Jays players
Frisco RoughRiders players
Gulf Coast Blue Jays players
Lansing Lugnuts players
Las Vegas Aviators players
Major League Baseball infielders
Nashville Sounds players
New Hampshire Fisher Cats players
Oakland Athletics players
Reno Aces players
Round Rock Express players
Sportspeople from Huntington Beach, California
Vancouver Canadians players
American expatriate baseball players in Australia